Saitual is a census town in saitual district in the Indian state of Mizoram.The capital of Saitual District saitual district is Saitual.

History
Saitual, earlier known as Saihmar Khan, was founded by Dorawta Sailo who after conversion wanted to create a Christian settlement in the year 1912, at first about 16 families joined them but later more people joined them in 1916, as population increased schools and other facilities were created. There is, however, disagreement about who founded the village. According to the dissenters, about 12 families had already settled in Saitual in 1914. Since the fledgling village was situated in the ruling clan Sailo lands, Dorawta Sailo was approached to become Chief of the village which he did in 1915. As this town is celebrating its centennial year in 2015, it may be taken as fact that Chief Dorawta Sailo actually administered this village from 1915, a village founded by about 12 to 16 families prior to 1915 before it became a Sailo village in 1915

Demographics
 India census, Saitual had a population of 10,243. Males constitute 50% of the population and females 50%. Saitual has an average literacy rate of 83%, higher than the national average of 59.5%. The male literacy rate is 84%, and the female literacy rate is 82%. In Saitual, 14% of the population is under 6 years of age.

Transport 
The Distance between Saitual and Aizawl is 77 km and is connected with regular service of Buses and Maxicabs.

Tourism

Tam Dil 

Tam Dil Lake is a reservoir located in the hills 6 km from Saitual, a nearby town and 110 km from Aizawl.

Education 

There is one college Saitual College, under Mizoram University and a number of public and private schools.

Media 
The Major Newspapers in Saitual is the Saitual Post.

References 

Aizawl
Cities and towns in Aizawl district